Sathria is a genus of moths of the family Crambidae described by Julius Lederer in 1863.

Species
Sathria internitalis (Guenée, 1854)
Sathria onophasalis (Walker, 1859)
Sathria simmialis (Walker, 1859)

References

Spilomelinae
Crambidae genera
Taxa named by Julius Lederer